Andrey Cherniyenko (born 17 October 1996) is a Ukrainian footballer who plays as a defender for Stalitsa Minsk.

Career
Cherniyenko is a product of the Yunist Chernihiv and SDYuShOR Desna academies. In 2009 he moved to Sevastopol where he won the 2009–10 Ukrainian First League. In 2012 he returned to his native city to play for YSB Chernihiv where he won the Chernihiv Oblast Football Cup. In 2014 he moved to BCH Gomel in Belarus, where he played for four seasons. In 2018 he moved to Stalitsa Minsk, where he won the 2018–19 Belarusian Futsal Premier League.

Personal life
He is a graduate of Chernihiv National Pedagogical University.

Honours
Stalitsa Minsk
 Belarusian Futsal Premier League: 2018–19

YSB Chernihiv
 Chernihiv Oblast Football Cup: 2012

Sevastopol
 Ukrainian First League: 2009–10

References

External links
 Andrey Cherniyenko at Stalitsa Minsk 
 Andrey Cherniyenko at upl.ua 

1987 births
Living people
Footballers from Chernihiv
SDYuShOR Desna players
FC Chernihiv players
FC Yunist Chernihiv players
FC Sevastopol players
MFC Stalitsa Minsk players
Ukrainian footballers
Ukrainian Second League players
Association football defenders
Ukrainian expatriate sportspeople in Belarus